The Aero Cycling Team is a Dominican cycling team focusing on road bicycle racing.

History
The team won in 2017 the elite national championships of the Dominican Republic, with Nelson Sánchez winning the road race and Augusto Sánchez the time trial.

Team roster

Major Results

2016
Overall Vuelta a la Independencia Nacional, Nelson Sánchez
Stage 1 (TTT)
Stages 3 & 4, Nelson Sánchez
Stage 5, Norlandy Tavera
2017
Overall Vuelta a la Independencia Nacional, Nelson Sánchez
Stage 1 (TTT)
Stage 7, Nelson Sánchez

National champions 
2015
 Dominican Republic National Time Trial Championships: Rafael Merán
 Dominican Republic National Road Race Championships: Norlandy Tavera

2017
 Dominican Republic National Time Trial Championships: Augusto Sánchez
 Dominican Republic National Road Race Championships: Nelson Sánchez

References

UCI Continental Teams (America)
Cycling teams based in the Dominican Republic
Cycling teams established in 2016